An associate company (or associate) in accounting and business valuation is a company in which another company owns a significant portion of voting shares, usually 20–50%. In this case, an owner does not consolidate the associate's financial statements. Ownership of over 50% creates a subsidiary, with its financial statements being consolidated into the parent's books. Associate value is reported in the balance sheet as an asset, the investor's proportional share of the associate's income is reported in the income statement and dividends from the ownership decrease the value on the balance sheet. In Europe, investments into associate companies are called fixed financial assets.

Associate value in the enterprise value equation is the reciprocate of minority interest.

Under the UK Companies Act 2006, two companies are "associated" if one company is a subsidiary of the other or both are subsidiaries of the same body corporate.

References

External links
Basis of Consolidation

Corporate law
Mergers and acquisitions
Financial accounting